Karimabad-e Tabasi (also Romanized as Karīmābād-e Ţabasī; also known as Karīmābād) is a village in Chahdegal Rural District, Negin Kavir District, Fahraj County, Kerman Province, Iran. At the 2006 census, its population was 534, in 120 families.

References 

Populated places in Fahraj County